The white-fronted scops owl (Otus sagittatus) is a small Asian owl in the family Strigidae. It has a small and declining population about which little is known, and is dependent on lowland and foothill forests which are rapidly being destroyed. This species of owl is considered vulnerable and has a population of about 2,500–10,000. It is found in western Thailand and peninsular Malaysia.

The white-fronted scops owl was described by the American ornithologist John Cassin in 1849 and given the binomial name Ephialtes sagittatus. The species is monotypic.

The white-fronted scops owl has two modes of defence. The first is that it can puff up its feathers to triple its body size. The second is that it can stretch its body upwards and turn its head at an angle in the direction of the predator that it is hiding from, reducing its profile and hence visibility.

References

External links

 White-fronted Scops Owl at OwlPages.com
 
 
 
 
 

white-fronted scops owl
Birds of the Malay Peninsula
white-fronted scops owl